Ondrej Janík (Myjava, 1990) is a Slovak professional ice hockey player who played with HC Slovan Bratislava in the Slovak Extraliga.

References

External links

Living people
HC Slovan Bratislava players
1990 births
Slovak ice hockey defencemen
People from Myjava
Sportspeople from the Trenčín Region
HK Nitra players
Slovak expatriate ice hockey people
Expatriate ice hockey players in France
Slovak expatriate sportspeople in France